Priscila Cachoeira Gomes Da Silva (born 19 August 1988) is a Brazilian female mixed martial arts fighter. She currently competes in the Flyweight division in the Ultimate Fighting Championship.

Personal life
Cachoeira had a troubled childhood growing up.  She played volleyball for Fluminense, but was removed from the team. In her youth Cachoeira's father refused to admit that she was his daughter, her brother-in-law sexually molested her, and she discovered that her boyfriend was cheating on her. In her twenties Cachoeira became addicted to crack cocaine, and would spend many years of her life as an addict before her mother finally managed to help her leave her addiction and turn to mixed martial arts.

Cachoeira had a son born in 2013. She was in a relationship with another woman until 2018, when they split up because her partner was spending all her money. While recovering from her knee injury, Cachoeira's training was sponsored by Brazilian football club Vasco da Gama.

In July 2021, news surfaced that Cachoeira's former girlfriend was granted a restraining order against Cachoeira after accusing her of three assaults. Cachoeira denied the accusations and pressed charges against her ex-girlfriend for defamation in turn.

Mixed martial arts career

Ultimate Fighting Championship 
Cachoeira made her UFC debut on 3 February 2018 at UFC Fight Night 125 against Valentina Shevchenko. She lost the fight via rear-naked choke in the second round as Shevchenko thoroughly dominated Cachoeira, outstriking her 230-3. Referee Mario Yamasaki was harshly criticized by UFC president Dana White for not stopping the fight sooner.

Cachoeira suffered a knee injury in the fight with Shevchenko which required surgery, and kept her out of the sport for more than a year.

Cachoeira's second UFC fight came on 15 March 2019 against Molly McCann at UFC Fight Night: Till vs. Masvidal. She lost the fight via unanimous decision.

A flyweight bout between Luana Carolina and Yanan Wu was scheduled for UFC 237. However it was reported on 22 April 2019 that Wu had pulled out of the event due to injury and she was replaced by Cachoeira. Carolina went on to defeat Cachoeira by unanimous decision.

Cachoeira was expected to face Ariane Lipski at UFC on ESPN+ 22. However, Cachoeira was removed from the card after testing positive for a banned substance that was collected on October 12, 2019 during an out-of-competition urine sample. In turn, Lipski was re-scheduled to fight at UFC Fight Night: Ortega vs. The Korean Zombie against Veronica Macedo on December 21, 2019. Cachoeira was suspended by USADA for four months for testing positive for (diuretic), hydrochlorothiazide (HCTZ) and its metabolites chlorothiazide and 4amino-6chloro-1,3-benzenedisulfonamide (ACB). She was eligible to fight again on February 12, 2020.

Cachoeira faced Shana Dobson on February 23, 2020 at UFC Fight Night 168. She won the fight via knockout in the first round. The win also recorded the fastest finish in UFC Women's Flyweight history. This win earned her a Performance of the Night award.

Cachoeira was expected to face Cortney Casey on October 31, 2020 at UFC Fight Night 181. However the bout was called off the day of the weigh-ins as Cachoeira had issues cutting weight.

Cachoeira faced Gina Mazany on May 15, 2021 at UFC 262. She won the bout via TKO at the end of the second round.

Cachoeira faced Gillian Robertson on December 11, 2021 at UFC 269. At the weigh-ins, Cachoeira weighed in at 129 pounds, three pounds over the flyweight non-title fight limit. The bout proceeded at catchweight with Cachoeira fined 30% of her purse, which went to her opponent Robertson. Robertson won the fight via a rear-naked choke submission in the first round. Cachoeira faced much criticism and backlash from fans and media after she gouged Robertson's eyes in an attempt to escape a rear-naked choke.

Cachoeira faced Ji Yeon Kim on February 26, 2022 at UFC Fight Night 202. She won the bout via controversial unanimous decision. 14 out 15 media scored Kim as the winner of the fight.  Along with Kim, Cachoeira was awarded the Fight of the Night bonus award.

Cachoeira was scheduled to faced Ariane Lipski on  August 6, 2022 at UFC on ESPN 40.  At the weigh-ins, Lipski weighed in at 128.5 pounds, two and a half pounds over the flyweight non-title fight limit. The bout is expected to proceed at catchweight with Lipski fined 20% of her purse, which will go to Cachoeira,  but they were rescheduled to UFC on ESPN 41 in a bantamweight bout after Lipski was not medically cleared. Cachoeira won the fight via technical knockout.

Cachoeira was scheduled to face Sijara Eubanks on January 14, 2023, at UFC Fight Night 217. However, Eubanks withdrew from the bout on the day of the weigh-ins due to complications related to her weight cut.

Cachoeira is scheduled to face Karine Silva on April 22, 2023 at UFC Fight Night 222.

Championships and achievements

Mixed martial arts
Ultimate Fighting Championship
 Performance of the Night (One time) 
 Fight of the Night (One time)

Mixed martial arts record

|-
|Win
|align=center|12–4
|Ariane Lipski
|TKO (punches)
|UFC on ESPN: Vera vs. Cruz
|
|align=center|1
|align=center|1:05
|San Diego, California, United States
|
|-
|Win
| style="text-align:center" | 11–4
|Ji Yeon Kim
|Decision (unanimous)
|UFC Fight Night: Makhachev vs. Green
|
| style="text-align:center" | 3
| style="text-align:center" | 5:00
|Las Vegas, Nevada, United States
|
|-
|Loss
| style="text-align:center" | 10–4
|Gillian Robertson
|Submission (rear-naked choke)
|UFC 269
|
| style="text-align:center" | 1
| style="text-align:center" | 4:59
|Las Vegas, Nevada, United States
|
|-
|Win
| style="text-align:center" | 10–3
|Gina Mazany
|TKO (punches)
|UFC 262
|
| style="text-align:center" | 2
| style="text-align:center" | 4:51
|Houston, Texas, United States
|
|-
|Win
| style="text-align:center" | 9–3
|Shana Dobson
|KO (punch)
|UFC Fight Night: Felder vs. Hooker
|
| style="text-align:center" | 1
| style="text-align:center" | 0:40
|Auckland, New Zealand
|
|-
|Loss
| style="text-align:center" | 8–3
|Luana Carolina
|Decision (unanimous)
|UFC 237
|
| style="text-align:center" | 3
| style="text-align:center" | 5:00
|Rio de Janeiro, Brazil
|
|-
| Loss
| style="text-align:center" | 8–2
| Molly McCann
| Decision (unanimous)
| UFC Fight Night: Till vs. Masvidal
| 
| style="text-align:center" | 3
| style="text-align:center" | 5:00
| London, England
|
|-
| Loss
| style="text-align:center" | 8–1
| Valentina Shevchenko
| Submission (rear-naked choke)
| UFC Fight Night: Machida vs. Anders
| 
| style="text-align:center" | 2
| style="text-align:center" | 4:25
| Belém, Brazil
|
|-
| Win
| style="text-align:center" | 8–0
| Rosy Duarte
| TKO (punches)
| Hipnose Fight Night 3
| 
| style="text-align:center" | 2
| style="text-align:center" | 4:54
| Angra dos Reis, Brazil
|
|-
| Win
| style="text-align:center" | 7–0
| Marta Souza
| Decision (majority)
| Curitiba Top Fight 11: Girls' Night 
| 
| style="text-align:center" | 3
| style="text-align:center" | 5:00
| Curitiba, Brazil
|
|-
| Win
| style="text-align:center" | 6–0
| Karoline Martins Moreira
| TKO (Punches)
| CUFA Fight Festival 5 
| 
| style="text-align:center" | 1
| style="text-align:center" | 0:49
| Rio de Janeiro, Brazil
| 
|-
| Win
| style="text-align:center" | 5–0
| Laisa Coimbra
| KO (Punches)
| Curitiba Top Fight 10
| 
| style="text-align:center" | 1
| style="text-align:center" | 1:09
| Curitiba, Brazil
|
|-
| Win
| style="text-align:center" | 4–0
| Alexandra de Cássia
| KO (punches)
| CUFA Fight Festival 4 
| 
| style="text-align:center" | 2
| style="text-align:center" | 2:50
| Rio de Janeiro, Brazil
|
|-
| Win
| style="text-align:center" | 3–0
| Amanda Torres Sardinha 
| Decision (unanimous)
| XForce MMA 4 
| 
| style="text-align:center" | 3
| style="text-align:center" | 5:00
| Macaé, Brazil
|
|-
| Win
| style="text-align:center" | 2–0
| Paula Baack 
| Decision (unanimous)
| Hipnose Fight Night 2
| 
| style="text-align:center" | 3
| style="text-align:center" | 5:00
| Angra dos Reis, Brazil
|
|-
| Win
| style="text-align:center" | 1–0
| Cleudilene Costa 
| Decision (unanimous)
| Your Chance 1 
| 
| style="text-align:center" | 3
| style="text-align:center" | 5:00
| Rio de Janeiro, Brazil
|
|-

References

External links 
 
 

1992 births
Living people
Bisexual sportspeople
Sportspeople from Rio de Janeiro (city)
Brazilian female mixed martial artists
Ultimate Fighting Championship female fighters
Strawweight mixed martial artists
Mixed martial artists utilizing Muay Thai
LGBT mixed martial artists
LGBT Muay Thai practitioners
Brazilian female kickboxers
Brazilian Muay Thai practitioners
Brazilian sportspeople in doping cases
Doping cases in mixed martial arts